Jorge Braíma Candé Nogueira (born 22 December 1995), known as Burá,  is a Bissau-Guinean footballer who plays for Iranian club Mes Kerman as a midfielder.

Football career
On 28 July 2018, Bura made his professional debut with Aves in a 2018–19 Taça da Liga match against Santa Clara.

On 13 July 2019 he signed a two-year contract with Farense, with the club holding an additional one-year extension option.
Represented the national team at 2019 Africa Cup of Nations

References

External links

1995 births
Living people
Bissau-Guinean footballers
Association football midfielders
Segunda Divisão players
Clube Oriental de Lisboa players
C.D. Aves players
S.C. Farense players
Primeira Liga players
Liga Portugal 2 players
Expatriate footballers in Portugal
Expatriate footballers in Iran
2019 Africa Cup of Nations players
2021 Africa Cup of Nations players
Persian Gulf Pro League players
Sanat Mes Kerman F.C. players